The Fargo-Moorhead Beez was a professional basketball club based in Fargo, North Dakota that competed in the International Basketball Association beginning in the 1995-1996 season. They were the 1995-1996 and the 1997-1998 International Basketball Association champions. 

The team joined the Continental Basketball Association in 2001 when the IBA folded, along with IBA rivals, the Dakota Wizards and the Saskatchewan Hawks. In their one and only CBA season, the Beez made the playoffs and faced off in a best-of-5 series with the Dakota Wizards for the National Conference Championship. The Wizards, however, won the series 3-0 and went on to become the 2002 CBA Champions. The Beez folded that following summer.

Notable former players include Chris "Birdman" Andersen, Tony Dunkin, and Ime Udoka (Boston Celtics head coach).

References

External links

Defunct basketball teams in the United States
Sports in Fargo, North Dakota
Basketball teams in North Dakota
Defunct sports teams in North Dakota
Basketball teams established in 1995
Sports clubs disestablished in 2002
1995 establishments in North Dakota
2002 disestablishments in North Dakota